ARCS may stand for:
 Alabama Regional Communications System, a radio/alert notification communications district in the State of Alabama
 Associate of the Royal College of Science
 ARCS (computing), a firmware bootloader
 Admiralty Raster Chart Service
 Alaska Rural Communications Service
 Anglia Regional Co-operative Society, a consumer co-operative in the UK
 Wide Angular-Range Chopper Spectrometer, a spectrometer at the Spallation Neutron Source
 Archaeosine synthase, an enzyme

See also
 ARC (disambiguation)